Michael Gregory Morony (born September 30, 1939) has been a professor of history at UCLA since 1974, with interests in the history of Ancient and Islamic Near East.

Morony was born in 1939 in Sacramento and was raised in Alaska. He holds a BA in Near Eastern Languages from the University of California, Berkeley, and an MA in Islamic Studies and a PhD (1972) in History from the University of California, Los Angeles. His dissertation, originally advised by Gustave von Grunebaum, was concerned with the history of Mesopotamia after the Islamic Conquests. The edited dissertation was later published as Iraq After the Muslim Conquest. Upon von Grunebaum's death, his dissertation was supervised by Nikki Keddie. In addition to these scholars, Morony has also worked with W. B. Henning in Berkeley and M. A. Shaban.

Morony's research is mostly concerned with the economic history of the Near East, North Africa and Muslim Iberia. He has written many articles on the subject and is considered  one of the authorities on the socio-economic history of the region in the pre-modern period.

Among the scholars who Morony served on the Ph.D. advisory committees of was Daniel C. Peterson, Vincent Cornell, Qamar-ul Huda, Mahmoud Ibrahim, and Touraj Daryaee.

Works
 
  Reprint (Piscataway, Gorgias Press, 2009).
 The History of al-Tabari, Vol. XVIII, "Between Civil Wars: The Caliphate of Mu'awiyah" (Albany, SUNY Press, 1987), translation
 
 
 
"Production and the Exploitation of Resources",  Series : The Formation of the Classical Islamic World: 11, (Andershot, Ashgate/Variorum, 2002),  (ed.)
"Manufacturing and Labour", Series : The Formation of the Classical Islamic World: 12, (Andershot, Ashgate/Variorum, 2003),  (ed.)

References

21st-century American historians
21st-century American male writers
University of California, Los Angeles faculty
University of California, Los Angeles alumni
University of California, Berkeley alumni
Living people
1939 births
Historians from California
American male non-fiction writers